Gabriel Popa may refer to:

 Gabriel Popa (painter) (1937–1995), Romanian painter
 Gabriel Popa (footballer) (born 1985), Romanian footballer
 Gabriel Popa (bobsleigh) (born 1977), Romanian Olympic bobsledder